Brough Fletcher (9 March 1893 – 12 May 1972) was a footballer and football manager.

He played for Sheffield Wednesday, Partick Thistle and Barnsley and managed Barnsley, Bristol Rovers and Walsall.

He scored the only goal of the game in Barnsley's shock FA Cup first-round victory in 1920 at champions elect West Bromwich Albion.

Personal life 
Fletcher served as a gunner in the Royal Field Artillery during the First World War.

Honours

As a manager 
Barnsley

 Football League Third Division North: 1933–34

References

External links

1893 births
1972 deaths
People from Allerdale
Footballers from Cumbria
English footballers
Chilton Colliery Recreation F.C. players
Shildon A.F.C. players
Barnsley F.C. players
Sheffield Wednesday F.C. players
English Football League players
English football managers
Barnsley F.C. managers
Bristol Rovers F.C. managers
Walsall F.C. managers
Scottish Football League players
Partick Thistle F.C. players
Association football inside forwards
Association football wing halves
British Army personnel of World War I
Royal Field Artillery soldiers